The 2009 Preakness Stakes was the 134th running of the Preakness Stakes, the second leg of horse racing's Triple Crown. The value of the race was $1,100,000 in stakes. The race was sponsored by BlackBerry and hence officially was called BlackBerry Preakness Stakes. The race took place on May 16, 2009. Post time was 6:19 p.m. EDT and was televised in the United States on the NBC television networks. 
The Maryland Jockey Club reported total attendance of 77,850, this is recorded as third highest on the list of American thoroughbred racing top attended events for North America in 2009.

Rachel Alexandra won by a length, holding off the rapidly closing 2009 Kentucky Derby winner Mine That Bird to become the first filly since 1924 to win the Preakness Stakes, and to extend horse racing's longest losing streak to 31 years since Affirmed became the last Triple Crown winner in 1978.

Payout 

The 134th Preakness Stakes Payout Schedule

 $1 Exacta: (13-2) paid $19.60
 $1 Trifecta: (13-2-3)  paid $108.10
 $1 Superfecta: (13-2-3-10)  paid $2,903.80

The full chart 
The draw for The Preakness Stakes was done on Wednesday, May 13, 2009 near the stakes barn at Pimlico Race Course. Rachel Alexandra was made the morning line 8-5 favorite, the first filly accorded that status since 1988. Twelve colts and a filly made up the field.

 Winning Breeder:  Dolphus C. Morrison; (KY) 
 Final Time – 1:55:08
 Track Condition – Fast
 Attendance - 77,850

Performance 

 The first Preakness victory by a filly since 1924 when Nellie Morse won.
 Calvin Borel was the first rider to win the Kentucky Derby and Preakness on different horses in the same year.
 First time since 1906 that a filly (Whimsical) won as a favorite
 First horse to win from post position 13
 Nielsen ratings were the second best since 1990. Only Smarty Jones's victory in 2004 was watched by more viewers since 1990

Infield 
The 2009 Preakness Stakes included entertainment in the infield. The performers in the infield included ZZ Top, Buckcherry, and Charm City Devils. In addition, there was a professional volleyball tournament in the infield. This year also marked the first year in which fans were not allowed to bring their own beverages into the infield, a move which has drawn some mixed reactions.  Infield ticket sales were down 17% this year, which some are attributing to the ban, but others attribute to the recession.

See also
2009 Kentucky Derby
2009 Belmont Stakes

References 

2009
Preakness Stakes
Horse races in Maryland
Preakness Stakes
2009 in sports in Maryland